There are communes that have the name Meslay in France:

Meslay, Calvados, in the Calvados département 
Meslay, Loir-et-Cher, in the Loir-et-Cher  département 
Meslay-du-Maine, in the Mayenne département 
Meslay-le-Grenet, in the Eure-et-Loir  département
Meslay-le-Vidame, in the Eure-et-Loir  département